The Fairy of Saint Ménard (German:Die Fee von Saint Ménard) is a 1919 German silent film directed by Erik Lund.

The film's art direction was by Siegfried Wroblewsky.

Cast
In alphabetical order
 Margot Hermer 
 Eva May 
 Karl Platen 
 Edwin Schäfer 
 Marie von Buelow 
 Leopold von Ledebur 
 Kissa von Sievers

References

Bibliography
 Hans-Michael Bock and Tim Bergfelder. The Concise Cinegraph: An Encyclopedia of German Cinema. Berghahn Books.

External links

1919 films
Films of the Weimar Republic
German silent feature films
Films directed by Erik Lund
German black-and-white films
1910s German films